Hunspell is a spell checker and morphological analyser designed for languages with rich morphology and complex word compounding and character encoding, originally designed for the Hungarian language.

Hunspell is based on MySpell and is backward-compatible with MySpell dictionaries. While MySpell uses a single-byte character encoding, Hunspell can use Unicode UTF-8-encoded dictionaries.

Uses

Software with Hunspell support:

License
Hunspell is free software, distributed under the terms of a GPL, LGPL and MPL tri-license.

About the author 
Hunspell was developed by the Hungarian biologist and free software developer László Németh. His recent job as a lead programmer is related to also free software, especially to LibreOffice. He contributes for OpenOffice.org/LibreOffice, as a code contributor since 2002 (spell checking, hyphenation etc.). He also contributes and makes patches for Hunspell spell checker with Unicode, compound word and agglutinative language support; Unicode and non-standard hyphenation; thesaurus component with stemming and suffixation; Lightproof grammar checker; Graphite versions of Linux Libertine and Biolinum fonts with extended typographical capabilities.

(László Németh is only homonymous with the dentist and writer László Németh, 1901-1975.)

See also 

 GNU Aspell
 Enchant
 Ispell
 MySpell
 Pspell
 Virastyar

References

External links

OpenOffice.org spelling dictionaries
OpenOffice.org Lingucomponent project
Release notes of OpenOffice.org 2.0.2
Mozilla bug report: Replace MySpell with HunSpell
Obtaining and Using Hunspell Compatible Dictionaries with XMetaL Author

Free spelling checking programs
Spell checkers
Language software for Linux
Language software for macOS
Language software for Windows